Tracy LaShawn Reid (born November 1, 1976) is a former professional WNBA basketball player.

Reid attended college at University of North Carolina and graduated in 1998. Selected by the Charlotte Sting in the first round (7th overall) of the 1998 WNBA Draft, Reid went on to capture the 1998 WNBA Rookie of the Year, the lowest pick to win the honor to date.

After three seasons with the Sting, Reid was dealt to the Miami Sol.  She also played with the Phoenix Mercury and Houston Comets.

Reid is the daughter of musician and songwriter Clarence Reid (a.k.a. Blowfly).

North Carolina statistics

Source

Reference

External links
WNBA Player Profile
Tracy Reid's Website

1976 births
Living people
All-American college women's basketball players
American women's basketball players
Basketball players from Miami
Charlotte Sting players
Miami Sol players
North Carolina Tar Heels women's basketball players
Parade High School All-Americans (girls' basketball)
Phoenix Mercury players
Power forwards (basketball)